Socket 495, sometimes referred to as µPGA2 is a CPU socket for the Intel Pentium III and Celeron mobile processors. This socket was also used in Microsoft's Xbox Console, but in a BGA (ball grid array) format for the Xbox CPU. This socket replaced Socket 615 (µPGA1), which was used in Pentium II and early Celeron mobile processors.

Technical specifications
This socket is a 495 pin CPU socket designed to house any processor in the Socket 495 package. The socket has a 1.27mm pitch and is designed to support a heatsink.

See also
 List of Intel processors
 List of Intel Celeron processors

References

Intel CPU sockets